David Sterne (born 1946) is an English actor. He has appeared in more than 90 films since 1973.

After leaving the British Army, Sterne trained at the Webber Douglas Academy of Dramatic Art. A former member of the Royal Shakespeare Company. He has worked in television, film and radio for over 40 years.

Filmography

Film

Television

Video games

References

External links 
 

Living people
1946 births
Alumni of the Webber Douglas Academy of Dramatic Art
British male stage actors
British male film actors
British male television actors
Royal Shakespeare Company members